Zorka Petrova Parvanova (born 4 May 1958, in Razlog) is a Bulgarian historian and former First Lady of Bulgaria from 2002 until 2012.  She is the wife of Georgi Parvanov, the former President of Bulgaria.

Early life and career
Paravanova was born 4 May 1958 in Razlog. Her education includes a degree from Sofia University in the field of History and Ethnography received in 1982. In addition she received a Ph.D. in History in 1989. From 1997 to 1999, she served as a lecturer at the Varna Free University and the Slavic University in Sofia. She has authored at least 20 publications and monographs. Parvanova is married to Georgi Parvanov. They have two sons, Vladimir and Ivaylo.

Honours
  : Dame Grand Cordon of the Order of Leopold
  : Dame Grand Cross of the Order of the Dannebrog (2006)  
  : Order of the Cross of Terra Mariana, 1st Class
  : Order of the Three Stars, 1st Class
  : Dame Grand Cross of the Order of Civil Merit (07/06/2003) 
  : Commander Grand Cross of the Order of the Polar Star

References

External links
 Biography on the website of the President of Bulgaria

1958 births
Living people
First ladies of Bulgaria
People from Razlog
Bulgarian women in politics

Recipients of the Order of the Cross of Terra Mariana, 1st Class
Grand Crosses of the Order of the Dannebrog
Grand Cross of the Order of Civil Merit
Macedonian Bulgarians
20th-century Bulgarian historians
Sofia University alumni
Women historians